Glenorchy is a town in the Wimmera district of the Australian state of Victoria.

The town was established around the "Four Posts Inn", opened in 1847 and within two years boasted a store, smithy and post office. The town was surveyed in 1850 by Robert Buchanan who named it after Glen Orchy in Scotland.

In 2010, Glenorchy was subjected to flooding after the Wimmera River broke its banks.

References